The tetraoxygen molecule (O4), also called oxozone, is an allotrope of oxygen consisting of four oxygen atoms.

History 
Tetraoxygen was first predicted in 1924 by Gilbert N. Lewis, who proposed it as an explanation for the failure of liquid oxygen to obey Curie's law. Though not entirely inaccurate, computer simulations indicate that although there are no stable O4 molecules in liquid oxygen, O2 molecules do tend to associate in pairs with antiparallel spins, forming transient O4 units. In 1999, researchers thought that solid oxygen in its ε-phase, also known as red oxygen, (at pressures above 10 GPa) was O4. However, in 2006, it was shown by X-ray crystallography that this stable phase is in fact octaoxygen.  Nevertheless, positively charged tetraoxygen has been detected as a short-lived chemical species in mass spectrometry experiments.

Structure 

Theoretical calculations have predicted the existence of metastable O4 molecules with two different shapes: a "puckered" square like cyclobutane or S4, and a "pinwheel" with three oxygen atoms surrounding a central one in a trigonal planar formation similar to boron trifluoride.

In 2001, a team at the University of Rome La Sapienza conducted a neutralization-reionization mass spectrometry experiment to investigate the structure of free O4 molecules. Their results did not agree with either of the two proposed molecular structures, but they did agree with a complex between two O2 molecules, one in the ground state and the other in a specific excited state.

Absorption bands of O4 e.g. at 360, 477 and 577 nm are frequently used to achieve aerosol inversions in atmospheric optical absorption spectroscopy. Due to the known distribution of O2 and therefore also O4, O4 slant column densities can be used to retrieve aerosol profiles which can then be used again in radiative transfer models to model light paths.

See also
Tetranitrogen (N4)
Solid oxygen
Liquid oxygen

References

Allotropes of oxygen
2001 in science

de:Allotrope Formen von Sauerstoff#Tetrasauerstoff